Parabrimus ruficornis is a species of beetle in the family Cerambycidae. It was described by Breuning in 1981.
The species is combined with the Parabrimus genus ranked in the Phrissomini tribe of Lamiinae.

References

Phrissomini
Beetles described in 1981